Ralph W. Hull (July 5, 1883 – May 20, 1943) was born in Crooksville, Ohio and grew up to be an American magician (specialty card magic) and magic author who invented a number of commercial effects, including the Mirage Deck (1934), and the Mental Photography Deck / Nudist Deck (1934).

He was also involved in his family business, the Hull Pottery manufacturing company out of Ohio. He is best known for the mechanical decks he developed using his rough and smooth principle.

Ralph W. Hull was also a performer at Coney Island as the Chautauqua & Lyceum headliner.

Published works
 Eye-Openers (1932)
 More Eye-Openers (1933)
 Modernism in Pasteboards (with Nelson C. Hahne) (1934)
 Smart Magic (with Nelson C. Hahne) (1935)
 Fifteen Minutes With A Rope (1937)
 The Testament of Ralph W. Hull by Trevor Hall (1945)

See also
 List of magicians

References

External links
 
Discussion of the Ralph Hull's Tuned Deck

American magicians
1883 births
1943 deaths
Sleight of hand
Card magic
Vaudeville performers
People from Perry County, Ohio